Karl-Georg Saebisch (1903–1984) was a German actor.

Selected filmography
 The Last Man (1955) - Jonas, der Kellner (uncredited)
 The Man Who Sold Himself (1959) - Lawyer Longinus
 The Crimson Circle (1960) - Insp. Parr 
 The Terrible People (1960) - Bankier Monkford / Lehrer Monkford
  (1963, TV film) - Juror 10
 Murderer in the Fog (1964) - Herr Auer 
 Krankensaal 6 (1974) - Awerjanytsch

References

External links
 

1903 births
1984 deaths
German male film actors
German male television actors
People from Nysa, Poland
People from the Province of Silesia
20th-century German male actors